Isanthidae is a small family of sea anemones in the class Anthozoa.

Genera
The following genera are recognized:

 Anthoparactis Häussermann & Rodríguez , 2014
 Austroneophellia Zamponi, 1978
 Cnidanthea
 Eltaninactis Dunn, 1983
 Isanthus
 Neophellia
 Paraisanthus Sanamyan & Sanamyan, 1998
 Zaolutus

References

 
Metridioidea
Cnidarian families